Bado Hill Station (also known as Bado Jabal Hill Station) (Urdu: بڈو, Sindhi: بڊو ) is a Hill Station located in Dadu District, Sindh, Pakistan. It is situated at an elevation of 3000 ft (914 m) in the Kirthar Mountains, 65 kilometers (40 mi) northwest of Sehwan It is an attractive place for nature-lovers due to its pleasant weather and beautiful surroundings as it is adjacent to several beautiful Plateaus and mountains of the  Kirthar Ranges.

See also
Kirthar Mountains
Gorakh Hill

References

Mountains and hills of Sindh
Dadu District
Hill stations in Pakistan